Bakharz (also known as Ostā-ye Bākharz, Ostād, Ostād Bākharz, Ostay, and Usta) is a city and capital of Bakharz County, in Razavi Khorasan Province, Iran. At the 2006 census, its population was 6,854, in 1,661 families.

Notable people
 Ali ibn Hassan Bakharzi, poet and secretary
 Sayf al-Din Bakharzi (al-Bakharzi)

See also 

 List of cities, towns and villages in Razavi Khorasan Province

References 

Populated places in Bakharz County
Cities in Razavi Khorasan Province